Sideroxylon excavatum is a species of plant in the family Sapotaceae. It is endemic to Guerrero and Oaxaca states in Mexico.

References

excavatum
Endemic flora of Mexico
Flora of Guerrero
Flora of Oaxaca
Endangered biota of Mexico
Endangered plants
Taxonomy articles created by Polbot
Flora of the Sierra Madre del Sur